Munever Krajišnik (born 5 November 1962 in Dobošnica) is a former Yugoslav football player, from the 1980s and football coach.

Club career
Krajišnik played for several clubs in Yugoslavia, Belgium and East Germany.

References

External links 
users.skynet.be
fcc-supporters.org

1962 births
Living people
People from Lukavac
Association football forwards
Yugoslav footballers
Bosnia and Herzegovina footballers
FK Sloboda Tuzla players
K.V.C. Westerlo players
K.S.C. Lokeren Oost-Vlaanderen players
FC Carl Zeiss Jena players
Yugoslav First League players
DDR-Oberliga players
Yugoslav expatriate footballers
Expatriate footballers in Belgium
Yugoslav expatriate sportspeople in Belgium
Expatriate footballers in Germany
Expatriate footballers in East Germany
Yugoslav expatriates in East Germany
Bosnia and Herzegovina expatriate footballers
Bosnia and Herzegovina expatriate sportspeople in Belgium